Annapurna II is part of the Annapurna mountain range located in Nepal, and is the eastern anchor of the range.

In terms of elevation, isolation (distance to a higher summit, namely Annapurna I East Peak) and prominence, Annapurna II does not rank far behind Annapurna I Main, which serves as the western anchor. It is a fully independent peak, despite the close association with Annapurna I Main which its name implies; it is, however, closely connected to the shorter Annapurna IV. Annapurna II is the 16th highest mountain in the world and the second highest peak of the Annapurna mountain range.

Features

Annapurna II sits apart from the main ridge of the Annapurna Massif, along with the shorter Annapurna IV. Its summit proper lies along a steep rock ridge, relatively free of snow towards its highest point, which drops in altitude to run west to the summit of the smaller peak. The South Face is a large pyramidal wall only interrupted by the central spur, while the North Face is more complex, with steep walls cascading between ice fields near the summit and base of the mountain. To the northwest, a large hanging glacier occupies the flank between it and Annapurna IV, while the Northeastern wall has a distinctive, recurrent series of cornices and rock bands resembling a human face or skull, visible in the above photograph.

Annapurna II is notable for its large avalanches, especially those originating from the high snowpack behind the North-central buttress. Other dangers include rockfall, large ice overhangs, and frequent storms. These have limited the scope of mountaineering expeditions, indeed, the standard route of ascent uses the central connecting ridge with Annapurna IV to bypass many of its objective hazards.

Climbing history

It was first climbed in 1960 by a British/Indian/Nepalese team led by J. O. M. Roberts via the West Ridge, reached by climbing the North face of Annapurna IV. The summit party comprised Richard Grant, Chris Bonington, and Sherpa Ang Nyima.

Yugoslavs from Slovenia repeated this ascent in 1969, also climbing Annapurna IV. Kazimir Drašlar and Matija Maležič reached the summit. In 1973 Japanese took a shortcut by climbing directly up the north face between IV and V before continuing along the west ridge. Katsuyuki Kondo reached the top by himself.

In 1983, Tim Macartney-Snape planned and participated in an expedition to Annapurna II, reaching the summit via the first ascent of the south spur. The descent was delayed by a blizzard and the expedition ran out of food during the last five days.  They were reported missing and when the expedition eventually returned they received significant publicity.

On Feb 2, 2007; Philipp Kunz, Lhakpa Wangel, Temba Nuru and Lhakpa Thinduk made the first winter ascent. The team followed the route of the first ascent from the north.

References

See also
 Annapurna
 Annapurna IV
 Annapurna I Main
 Annapurna I Central
 Annapurna I East
 Annapurna III

Seven-thousanders of the Himalayas
Mountains of the Gandaki Province